N. M. Anwar was an Indian politician. He was Member of Rajya Sabha from Tamil Nadu. He served from 1960 to 1966 representing the Indian National Congress.

He was General secretary of All India Muslim Majlis-e-Mushawwarat.

References 

Members of the Rajya Sabha
Indian National Congress (Organisation) politicians